The Sumers Lodge in Glenwood Springs, Colorado is a rustic log house built in 1935 for New York financier George Sumers.  It was designed by Chilson Aldrich, and some of its furnishings were designed and made by Thomas C. Molesworth.

The Sumers Lodge is a large two story rectangular log structure with a projecting sun porch on the entrance side. It was listed on the National Register of Historic Places in 1997.

See also
National Register of Historic Places listings in Garfield County, Colorado

References

Houses on the National Register of Historic Places in Colorado
Houses completed in 1935
Houses in Garfield County, Colorado
Rustic architecture in Colorado
National Register of Historic Places in Garfield County, Colorado